Henri Valbel (1885–1956) was a French film actor.

Selected filmography
 Simone (1918)
 Madonna of the Sleeping Cars (1928)
 The Divine Voyage (1929)
 The Tunnel (1933)
 Forces occultes (1943)
 Girl with Grey Eyes (1945)
 The Agony of the Eagles (1952)

References

Bibliography
 Goble, Alan. The Complete Index to Literary Sources in Film. Walter de Gruyter, 1999.

External links

Male actors from Paris
1885 births
1956 deaths
French male film actors
French male silent film actors
20th-century French male actors